Shri Venkateshwara University (SVU) is a private university located in Gajraula,  Uttar Pradesh, India. The university was established in 2010 through the Shri Venkateshwara University Uttar Pradesh Act, 2010 as a venture of the Venkateshwara Group Of Institutions. SVU offers courses in the fields of engineering, architecture, business studies, medical science,  design and language and cultural studies, among others.

Courses
In October 2021, the university entered into collaboration with the First Aid Council of India to conduct first aid courses. The courses include certificate and diploma courses such as Certificate in First Aid Treatment and First Aid Specialist Diploma Course.

List of Schools:

 Medical Sciences
 Paramedical Sciences
 Pharmaceutical Sciences
 Nursing
 Applied Sciences
 Commerce & Management
 Engineering & Technology
 Human Languages & Social Sciences
 Education
 Library & Information Sciences
 Law & Jurisprudence
 Agriculture
Phd Programmes offered by Shri Venkateshwara University

 Ph.D. in Engineering
 Ph.D. in Education
 Ph.D. in Law
 Ph.D. in Nursing
 Ph.D. in Agriculture
 Ph.D. in Commerce & Management
 And more...

References

External links 
 

Private universities in Uttar Pradesh
Amroha district
Educational institutions established in 2010
2010 establishments in Uttar Pradesh